Father Jurgis Ambrozijus (Ambraziejus) Pabrėža (born 15 January 1771 in Večiai, Skuodas District Municipality; died 30 October 1849 in Kretinga) was a Lithuanian Franciscan priest, botanist, and educator. He created first systematic guide of Lithuanian flora Taislius auguminis (Botany), written in Samogitian dialect, the Latin-Lithuanian dictionary of plant names, and the first Lithuanian textbook of geography.

References

Further reading 
 
 

1771 births 
1849 deaths
18th-century Lithuanian Roman Catholic priests
19th-century Lithuanian Roman Catholic priests
Lithuanian botanists